Paavo Nuotio (13 March 1901 – 14 November 1968) was a Finnish ski jumper and Nordic combined skier. He was born in Heinola. He competed at the 1928 Winter Olympics in St. Moritz, where he placed fourth in Nordic combined and 12th in ski jumping.

References

External links

1901 births
1968 deaths
Finnish male ski jumpers
Finnish male Nordic combined skiers
Olympic ski jumpers of Finland
Olympic Nordic combined skiers of Finland
Ski jumpers at the 1928 Winter Olympics
Nordic combined skiers at the 1928 Winter Olympics
Pesäpallo players
People from Heinola
Sportspeople from Päijät-Häme
20th-century Finnish people